The following lists events that happened during 1867 in Australia.

Incumbents
Governors
Governors of the Australian colonies:
Governor of New South Wales – John Young, 1st Baron Lisgar, until 11 August then Somerset Lowry-Corry, 4th Earl Belmore
Governor of Queensland – Sir George Bowen
Governor of South Australia – Sir Dominick Daly
Governor of Tasmania – Colonel Thomas Browne
Governor of Victoria – Sir John Manners-Sutton
Governor of Western Australia – Dr John Hampton

Premiers
Premiers of the Australian colonies:
Premier of New South Wales – James Martin
Premier of Queensland – Robert Herbert until 15 August then Robert Mackenzie
Premier of South Australia – James Boucaut until 3 May then Henry Ayers (for the 3rd time)
Premier of Tasmania – Richard Dry
Premier of Victoria – James McCulloch

Events
 7 January – Riots at the Crocodile Creek goldfield destroyed the property of Chinese miners.
 1 June – Greatest recorded flood of the Hawkesbury River at 19.2 metres.
 12 October – The transportation of convicts to Western Australia ceases when the last convict ship to Western Australia, the Hougoumont, left Britain.
 16 October – English immigrant James Nash reports to authorities that he has discovered 75 ounces of alluvial gold in a creek at Gympie, Queensland. The find sparks a gold rush to the area, saving the colony of Queensland from bankruptcy.
 30 October – Prince Alfred, second son of Queen Victoria, arrives in Australia for the country's first royal visit.

Religion
 Saint Mary MacKillop and Fr Julian Tenison Woods found the Sisters of St Joseph of the Sacred Heart

Arts and literature
 National Gallery of Victoria Art School accepts its first students

Sport
 Tim Whiffler wins the Melbourne Cup

Births

 10 February – Chester Manifold, Victorian politician (d. 1918)
 18 March – Charles Web Gilbert, sculptor (b. 1925)
 8 April – Sir Arthur Streeton, artist (d. 1943)
 9 April – Chris Watson, 3rd Prime Minister of Australia (born in Chile) (d. 1941)
 22 April – Sir Littleton Groom, Queensland politician (d. 1936)
 17 June
 Franc Falkiner, New South Wales politician and grazier (d. 1929)
 Henry Lawson, writer and poet (d. 1922)
 4 December – Sir Stanley Argyle, 32nd Premier of Victoria (d. 1940)
 26 December – John Bradfield, engineer (d. 1943)

Deaths

 11 January – Sir Stuart Donaldson, 1st Premier of New South Wales (b. 1812)
 25 June
 John Clarke, bushranger (b. 1846)
 Thomas Clarke, bushranger (b. 1840)

References

 
Australia
Years of the 19th century in Australia